Bejaranoa balansae is a flowering plant in the genus Bejaranoa. Its native range is between Bolivia and northern Argentina.

References

Flora of South America
Eupatorieae